The Daya River starts as a branch of the Kuakhai River at Saradeipur (near Badahati) in Odisha state in India. It is joined by the Malaguni River below Golabai and flows through Khordha and Puri districts before emptying into the north-eastern corner of Chilika Lake,  from its origin.

It is a hill with vast open space adjoining it, and has major edicts of Ashoka engraved on a mass of rock, by the side of the road leading to the summit of the hill. Dhauli hill is presumed to be the area where Kalinga War was fought.

References

Rivers of Odisha
Tributaries of the Mahanadi River
Geography of Bhubaneswar
Rivers of India